Big Rig Bounty Hunters is an American reality TV program, which aired from February 14, 2013, to June 30, 2014, on the History Channel. The series followed bounty hunters who search for and retrieve lost, stolen, or otherwise missing tractor-trailer rigs, and, in some cases, towed vehicles and cargo on trailers. The show comprised recreations of situations that may or may not have happened in real life. After the final episode of season 2 aired on June 30, 2014, no further news came of the show, and the History Channel removed the show's page from their website.

The style of the show is somewhat similar to another show on the History Channel dealing with operation of large trucks, Ice Road Truckers. The show highlights the contrived activities of several crews of recovery agents all over the US who perform various recoveries of stolen or abandoned vehicles or rescues of incapacitated vehicles. The men get paid for their recovery actions and can receive bonuses for successful recovery of the cargo or contents of the trailers.

On March 22, 2017, Vince Jones, a star on the show died of a suspected heart attack. He had a condition known as sleep apnea, and he wasn't wearing his CPAP mask the night he died, which possibly contributed to his death.

Episodes

Season 1 (2013)

Season 2 (2014)

References

2010s American reality television series
2013 American television series debuts
2014 American television series endings
English-language television shows
History (American TV channel) original programming
Television shows set in Arizona
Television shows set in Colorado
Television shows set in Ohio
Television shows set in New Jersey
Television shows set in Texas